New York Athletic Club is an American women’s soccer team, founded in 2005. The team is a member of the Women's Premier Soccer League, the second tier of women’s soccer in the United States and Canada. The team plays in the North Division of the East Conference.

The team plays its home games at the New York Athletic Club on Travers Island in Pelham Manor, New York. The club's colors are red and blue.

The team has a brother organization called the New York Athletic Club, which plays in the National Premier Soccer League.

Players

Current roster
Amatura, Marissa 
Bustos, Lauren 
Brennan, Alana 
Di Martino, Vickie 
Fitzpatrick, Shannon 
Hardesty, Niki 
Howell, Mikaela 
Honor, Lily 
Militelllo, Caroline 
Melo, Natalie 
Nowak, Monika 
OSTER, DANIELLE 
Paloscio, Stephanie  
REISER, SOPHIE 
ROMINE, NATALIE 
Ryan, Chelsea 
Shreck, Jess 
SHEEHY, RACHEL 
Simpkins, Callie 
Solazzo, Elene 
Salmon, Brooke 
Sura, Emily 
Spivack, Alec 
Saunders, Tatiana

Notable former players
Jen Hoy, 2013 NWSL Draftee
Kim DeCesare, 2012 NWSL Draftee

Year-by-year

Honors
Women's Cup
Champions (1): 2014
Champions (1): 2010
Runners-up (1): 2012
Semifinalist (1): 2009
Women's Amateur
Champions (1): 2007
Semifinalist (1): 2008

Coaches
  Kim Wyant (current head)
  Michele Canning (current assistant)
  Courtney Carroll (2010–12)

Stadia
 New York Athletic Club  (2008–present)

External links
 New York Athletic Club
 WPSL New York Athletic Club page
 WPSL Roster
 WPSL Standings

Women's Premier Soccer League teams
Athletic
Women's soccer clubs in New York (state)
New York Athletic Club
2005 establishments in New York City
Association football clubs established in 2005